Melis "Mees" Gerritsen (born 15 September 1939) is a retired Dutch track cyclist who finished in fourth place in the 2 km tandem event at the 1960 Summer Olympics.

See also
 List of Dutch Olympic cyclists

References

1939 births
Living people
Olympic cyclists of the Netherlands
Cyclists at the 1960 Summer Olympics
Cyclists from Amsterdam
Dutch male cyclists